Sadat Colony Karachi Block 20 is located in Gulberg town in Karachi, Pakistan. It is a name of block 20 of Federal B Area, Karavhi and has a predominantly Shia population of around 99%. Initially it was the project of Sadat colony near Karachi airport in the early 1960s but because of expanded airport plans a few blocks of a proposed colony in that area was shifted to a newly formed subdivision of Karachi named F.B Area block 20. Four lanes of Block 20 constituting 1000, 400 and 200 yard square houses were allotted to Sadat Colony trust. Later on more Sadat (plural of Sayyed) moved to this block in 120 yard houses.

Gulberg Town, Karachi
Neighbourhoods in Pakistan